Out of the Question was an Australian chat and game show hosted by comedian Glenn Robbins. The show features Robbins quizzing celebrity guests on current events and popular culture. Each episode is recorded at Melbourne's HSV-7 digital studios at Melbourne Docklands within 48 hours of its airing.

The show premiered on Thursday 31 January 2008 on the Seven Network. Despite lacklustre prime time ratings for the initial batch of seven episodes, the show returned on 29 September 2008 at a later timeslot.

The show was not recommissioned beyond 2008, with Robbins suggesting in a later interview that he was more suited to a guest role rather than a role as host.

Format
Each week, several celebrity guests competed against each other in a three-round quiz revolving around current events and popular culture. In between questions, lighthearted discussion often took place about the subject of the question. The first season featured three guests per episode, with each guest answering questions individually; the second season expanded the number of guests to four, with guests competing as pairs.

Robbins asked the guests a series of questions in turn for the first two rounds, while in the final round each guest or pair can buzz in at any time to answer. Each correct answer earned them a point, but in practice points were generally given out at Robbins' own discretion. The guest or pair with the most points at the end of the show won and got their name engraved on an Out of the Question trophy.

List of episodes

References

External links
 Official website
 

2008 Australian television series debuts
2008 Australian television series endings
2000s Australian game shows
Australian television talk shows
Seven Network original programming
Television shows set in Victoria (Australia)
English-language television shows